Superarchitettura is a theoretical & conceptual framework, whose physical definition has been given at the homonymous 1966 exhibition, held at Jolly2, an art gallery of Pistoia, Italy.

According to the Radical Manifesto, "Superarchitettura is the architecture of superproduction, superconsumption, superinduction to consume, the supermarket, the superman, super gas".

Superarchitettura is the overcoming of centuries of constant and consistent art vision. It is the overtaking of ancient artistic pratiques in favour of new avant-gardes, the Sixties so-called "neo avant-gardes".

Superarchitettura's movement combined the inventiveness of Pop Art with the dynamics of mass production (for the latter, see its definition according to Mackintosh' ideas and conceptions).

Archizoom and Superstudio
The Superarchitettura theoretical framework, part of the Radical Design movement, after its beginning, got split up in two main philosophical entities and interpretations, the first incarnated by Archizoom Associati, the second by Superstudio. Archizoom and Superstudio held the Exhibition. Such event represented a milestone in the Italian Radical Design.

According to the first group (to which belonged "free thinkers" -architects and designers- like Andrea Branzi, Gilberto Corretti, Paolo Deganello, Massimo Morozzi, Dario Bartolini and Lucia Bartolini), in order to get away from Tradition, men must overturn conventions and exalt everything kitsch as a statement of aesthetic and ideological challenge.

On the other side, according to the second group (to which belonged Adolfo Natalini, Cristiano Toraldo di Francia, Piero Frassinelli, Alessandro Magris and Roberto Magris), to run away from Tradition, a new architecture must be imagined and created, which must be based on rejecting the impositions of production in favour of symbolic, dreamy values, which can ideologically fit into the landscape.

Anti-Design as the Sinthesis
These two philosophical interpretations of the Radical Design being conceivable as Socrates' "Thesis" and "Antithesis", its overcoming brought to a very peculiar "Synthesis". Such was the Anti-Design framework, son of such dispute.

Archizoom in particular is today considered the initiator of Anti-Design. Its members questioned from the ground the traditional status-function and basic-nature of design, as well as that of the architectural production.

References
Lang, Peter and Menking, William: "Superstudio. Life Without Objects", Skira, Milan, 2003
Fiell, Charlotte and Peter, "Design of the 20th Century", TASCHEN Icons Series - Turtleback, 2001
Branzi, Andrea: "Radical Notes", Casabella, n. 399, March 1975.
Tafuri, Manfredo and Dal Co, Francesco: "Internazionale dell'utopia, Architettura contemporanea", Electa, Milan, 1976.
Rouillard,Dominique: "Radical architettura", in "Tschumi, une architecture en projet: Le Fresnoy", Ed. Centre Georges Pompidou, Paris, 1993.
Pettena, Gianni: "Archipelago, architettura sperimentale 1959-99", Maschietto&musolino, Florence, 1999.
 Prestinenza Puglisi,Luigi: "This is tomorrow. Avanguardie e architettura contemporanea", Testo&Immagine, Turin, 1999.
 Patrizia Mello, "Neoavanguardie e controcultura a Firenze. Il movimento Radical e i protagonisti di un cambiamento storico internazionale", Angelo Pontecorboli, Firenze, 2017.

Italian art movements